Bradina perlucidalis is a moth in the family Crambidae. It was described by George Hampson in 1897. It is found on the Marquesas Islands.

References

Moths described in 1897
Bradina